Astra (Sanskrit: "weapon") is an Indian family of all weather beyond-visual-range air-to-air missile, developed by the Defence Research and Development Organisation. Astra Mk-1 has been integrated with Indian Air Force's Sukhoi Su-30MKI and will be integrated with Dassault Mirage 2000, HAL Tejas and Mikoyan MiG-29 in the future. Limited series production of Astra Mk-1 missiles began in 2017.

Description 
It uses mid-course inertial guidance driven by fibre optic gyroscope with terminal guidance through active radar homing. It is capable of receiving course corrections through a secure data link. The seeker can lock-on to a target with a radar cross section of 5 square metres from a distance of 15 km and enables off-boresight launches up to an angle of 45°. Some tests have been conducted in 2017 and 2018 using an indigenous seeker developed by Research Centre Imarat.

Astra Mk-1 is equipped with electronic counter-countermeasures to allow operation even during enemy attempts to jam the seeker using electronic countermeasures. It can be launched in both autonomous and buddy mode operation and can lock on to its target before or after it is launched.

Development 

Preliminary work on Astra Mk-1 had begun by 1990 with the completion of a pre-feasibility study. It was revealed to the public for the first time at Aero India 1998. It was described as an elongated Matra Super 530D with a smaller diameter in front of the wings. The project was to be led by Defence Research and Development Laboratory with assistance from Hindustan Aeronautics Limited and Electronics Corporation of India Limited. It was tested for the first time in May 2003.

The missile was redesigned around 2006 due to control issues and performance deficiencies at high altitude. The initial design of four cruciform short-span long-chord wings were replaced by cropped delta wings placed near the nose. The redesigned missile had an improved propulsion system and was tested for the first time in 2008. By 2013, the missile had been redesigned again in response to multiple failures caused by adverse interactions between flight control surfaces. The control, guidance, and propulsion systems were also reconfigured. It was tested from the ground thrice in December 2012 and captive trials from a Sukhoi Su-30MKI were held in April 2013.

Variants

Air-to-air missile versions

After the deployment of Astra Mk-1, several offshoot versions are being planned including an imaging Infra-red homing missile tentatively classified as Astra-IR, a longer range Astra Mk-2 version and a further development called Astra Mk-3.

India's DRDO is undertaking work on a Mk 2 version of the Astra missile and has planned to enhance its range using an in-house developed dual-pulse rocket motor by May 2022. The missile will have a similar design as well as share a smokeless propulsion of its predecessor Mk-1, boast a laser proximity fuze and some  newer technologies like a home-grown AESA radar seeker.

A future variant Mk-3 based on Solid Fuel Ducted Ramjet (SFDR) engine is being jointly developed by India and Russia.  The missile was first tested on 30 May 2018 and further test was carried out on 8 February 2019. The aim of the program to develop an indigenous missile rivalling  AIM-260 JATM and MBDA Meteor.

Surface-to-air missile versions

To fulfill the need of Indian Navy's replacement of Barak-1 short range surface-to-air missile system, DRDO successfully test fired two VL-SRSAM on 22 February 2021 at Odisha coast. The maiden launch tested the efficacy of vertical launch system and missile's maximum and minimum range. Both the missile successfully intercepted their target with pin point accuracy.

VL-SRSAM supersedes the cancelled Maitri missile project undertaken jointly by MBDA and DRDO based on the work done on MICA and Trishul. The missile will arm Indian Navy ships like Kamorta-class corvette with short range air defense system. The missile uses jet vane based thrust vectoring control to give high maneuverability to the missile. The missile maybe guided by Revathi radar which is extensively being used in Indian Navy ship like Kamorta-class corvette.

Indian Air Force may also sport VL-SRSAM in truck-based launcher to supplement its Akash surface-to-air missile as a quick reaction system similar to Norwegian/American NASAM 2.

Trials 
Astra Mk-1 went through a series of ground tests from 2003 till 2012 in three different configurations to validate the airframe, propulsion system, control system, dual mode guidance and night firing capability. Carriage trials were carried out in 2009 and 2013 on Sukhoi Su-30MKI. In May 2014, it was fired for the first time in air. On 18 March 2015, it successfully performed manoeuvre of upto 30g while engaging the target. The missile was fired in public during Iron Fist 2016 exercise from Sukhoi Su-30MKI. During a series of seven tests in September 2017, Astra Mk-1 was tested twice with an indigenous seeker.

Astra Mk-1 with an indigenous seeker (instead of a Russian variant supplied by AGAT) is expected to be tested for the first time in May 2022.

Astra Mk-2 

During an annual press conference on October 4, 2022, IAF released footage of Astra Mk-2 launched from Su-30MKI using Unified Common Launcher developed by DRDO with industry partners for air to air missiles.

Production 
Astra completed final development trials in September 2017 and was cleared for production by Bharat Dynamics Limited (BDL). The missile will be manufactured at Bhanur, Telangana for an initial order of 50 missiles. Additional order of 248 missiles were placed for Indian Air Force and Indian Navy for use on various platforms like Sukhoi Su-30MKI, HAL Tejas, MiG-29 / MiG-29K.

On 31 May 2022, Ministry of Defence (MoD) signed contract with BDL worth ₹2,971 crore (US$383 million) to produce 350+ units of Astra Mk-1 for Indian Air Force and Indian Navy under high priority Indian Designed, Developed and Manufactured (IDDM) category. DRDO already started the process of transferring technology of the missile and associated systems to BDL. Each missile will cost ₹7–8 crore. Astra Mk-1 along with other variants of this missile will progressively replace all Russian origin long range air to air missile in Indian fleet.

Operators

  Indian Air Force
 Indian Navy

Gallery

See also

 AIM-120 AMRAAM
 Derby (missile)
 MICA (missile)
 R-77
 R-27EA
 PL-12
 R-Darter
 Meteor
 PL-15

References

External links 

 Globalsecurity
 Bharat Rakshak

Technical:
 DRDO Technology Focus : Warhead for Missiles, Torpedoes and Rockets

Defence Research and Development Organisation
Air-to-air missiles of India
Guided missiles of India
Post–Cold War weapons of India
Military equipment introduced in the 2010s